Creataloum is a monotypic of tiger moth genus in the family Erebidae erected by Vladimir Viktorovitch Dubatolov in 2004. Its only species, Creataloum arabicum, was first described by George Hampson in 1896. It is found in Egypt, southern Arabia, southern Iraq, southern Iran and southern Pakistan.

References

External links

Spilosomina
Monotypic moth genera
Moths of Asia